Statistics of the COVID-19 pandemic may refer to:

 COVID-19 pandemic in Afghanistan
 COVID-19 pandemic in Albania
 COVID-19 pandemic in Algeria
 COVID-19 pandemic in Argentina
 Statistics of the COVID-19 pandemic in Australia
 COVID-19 pandemic in Austria

 COVID-19 pandemic in the Bahamas
 COVID-19 pandemic in Bangladesh
 COVID-19 pandemic in Belgium
 COVID-19 pandemic in Bolivia
 COVID-19 pandemic in Bosnia and Herzegovina
 Statistics of the COVID-19 pandemic in Brazil
 COVID-19 pandemic in Bulgaria

 COVID-19 pandemic in Cambodia
 COVID-19 pandemic in Canada
 Statistics of the COVID-19 pandemic in Chile
 Statistics of the COVID-19 pandemic in mainland China
 COVID-19 pandemic in Colombia
 COVID-19 pandemic in Costa Rica
 COVID-19 pandemic in Croatia

 COVID-19 pandemic in the Dominican Republic

 COVID-19 pandemic in Ecuador

 COVID-19 pandemic in Finland
 COVID-19 pandemic in France
 COVID-19 pandemic in French Polynesia

 Statistics of the COVID-19 pandemic in Germany
 COVID-19 pandemic in Ghana
 COVID-19 pandemic in Greece

 COVID-19 pandemic in Hungary

 Statistics of the COVID-19 pandemic in India
 Statistics of the COVID-19 pandemic in Tamil Nadu, India
 Statistics of the COVID-19 pandemic in Indonesia
 COVID-19 pandemic in Iraq
 Statistics of the COVID-19 pandemic in Italy

 COVID-19 pandemic in Jamaica
 Statistics of the COVID-19 pandemic in Japan

 COVID-19 pandemic in Kosovo
 COVID-19 pandemic in Kyrgyzstan

 COVID-19 pandemic in Laos

 Statistics of the COVID-19 pandemic in Malaysia
 COVID-19 pandemic in Mexico
 COVID-19 pandemic in Mongolia
 COVID-19 pandemic in Montenegro
 COVID-19 pandemic in Morocco
 COVID-19 pandemic in Myanmar

 COVID-19 pandemic in Namibia
 COVID-19 pandemic in Nepal
 COVID-19 pandemic in the Netherlands
 COVID-19 pandemic in Nigeria
 COVID-19 pandemic in Norfolk Island (Australia)
 COVID-19 pandemic in Norway

 Statistics of the COVID-19 pandemic in Pakistan
 COVID-19 pandemic in the State of Palestine
 COVID-19 pandemic in Papua New Guinea
 Statistics of the COVID-19 pandemic in Peru
 COVID-19 pandemic in the Philippines
 Statistics of the COVID-19 pandemic in Poland
 Statistics of the COVID-19 pandemic in Portugal

 COVID-19 pandemic in Romania
 Statistics of the COVID-19 pandemic in Russia

 Statistics of the COVID-19 pandemic in Serbia
 Statistics of the COVID-19 pandemic in Singapore
 COVID-19 pandemic in Slovakia
 COVID-19 pandemic in Sri Lanka
 COVID-19 pandemic in South Korea
 COVID-19 pandemic in Suriname
 COVID-19 pandemic in Svalbard (Norway)
 COVID-19 pandemic in Syria

 Statistics of the COVID-19 pandemic in Thailand
 COVID-19 pandemic in East Timor (Timor-Leste)
 COVID-19 pandemic in Tunisia

 COVID-19 pandemic in Ukraine
 Statistics of the COVID-19 pandemic in the United Kingdom
 Statistics of the COVID-19 pandemic in the United States
 COVID-19 pandemic in Uruguay
 COVID-19 pandemic in Uzbekistan

 COVID-19 pandemic in Venezuela
 COVID-19 pandemic in Vietnam

 COVID-19 pandemic in Yemen